Liu Qubei (pinyin: Liú Qùbēi), (died 272) was a Tiefu Xiongnu chieftain from 260 to 272. He bore the title "Right Virtuous Prince" (known in the Book of Wei as the "Left Virtuous Prince").

There is uncertainty about the lineage of Liu Qubei; some records say that he was the second son of the Xiongnu Chanyu Yufuluo (於扶羅), and that he was an uncle of the Han Zhao ruler Liu Yuan.

Former Zhao emperors
Xia (Sixteen Kingdoms) people
Xiongnu
272 deaths
Year of birth unknown